Mansour Rahbani (17 March 1925 – 13 January 2009) was a Lebanese composer, musician, poet, philosopher, thinker and producer, known as one of the Rahbani brothers, and the brother-in-law of the singer Fairuz.

Career 
During his musical education he collaborated with his brother Assi in creating the Rahbani brothers. They took their new artistic direction to the Lebanese Radio in 1945.  The delivery of a ‘Rahbanian’ song was not an easy task; however, it had faced up to the strong current of the traditional song and heritage, which dominated the entirety of the Eastern World since the beginning of the twentieth century, through Salama Hegazi and Abdou El-Hamouli.

The two brothers went on to join the ranks of the Near East Radio, where they composed many artistic works as well as a series of sketches entitled “Sabeh and Makhoul”.  When Assi married Nouhad Haddad (also known as Fairuz) in 1955, the two brothers formed a new Rahbani trio with her.  They composed poems and songs, which Fairuz would sing with great prowess.

Poetry
Mansour wrote four Diwans in his life as a poet:
 Al-Quṣur Al-Mai'yyah, القصور المائية (The Aquatic Castles)
 Osafer Waḥde Malekan, أسافر وحدي ملكاً (Traveling Alone as a King)
 Ana Al-Ġareeb Al-Aḫar, أنا الغريب الأخر (I am the Other Stranger)
 Baḥar Al-shete, بحار الشتي (The Winter's Sailor)

Theatre 
The Rahbani singing theatre is considered as a unique form, which differs somewhat from the international standard for operas. It focuses on the values of dignity, truth, gracefulness, and the depth of its philosophical subjects in order to concentrate on the three main subjects of God, the Human Being, and the Land. 

The Rahbani Brothers have also extended their activities to the world of cinema, and composed the music for three illustrious films: Biyaa el Khawatem (The Ring Seller), Safar Barlek (Exile), and Bent el Hares (The Guardian’s Daughter).

Death 
Rahbani was admitted to the "Hôtel-Dieu de France" hospital in Beirut, Lebanon, following a severe case of pneumonia. He spent three days in intensive care after which he died on 13 January 2009, at the age of 83.

See also
Assi Rahbani

References

External links
 Byblosfestival.org

1925 births
2009 deaths
20th-century Lebanese poets
Lebanese musicians
Lebanese songwriters
Greek Orthodox Christians from Lebanon
Eastern Orthodox Christians from Lebanon
Deaths from pneumonia in Lebanon
Lebanese male poets
20th-century male writers